QP 14 (13–26 September 1942) was an Arctic convoy of the QP series which ran during the Second World War. It was one of a series of convoys run to return Allied ships from Soviet northern ports to home ports in Britain. The convoy sailed from Archangel in Russia to Loch Ewe in Scotland.

Background

Arctic Ocean

Between Greenland and Norway are some of the most stormy waters of the world's oceans,  of water under gales full of snow, sleet and hail. Around the North Cape and the Barents Sea the sea temperature rarely rises about 4° Celsius and a man in the water would probably die unless rescued immediately. The cold water and air made spray freeze on the superstructure of ships, which had to be removed quickly to avoid the ship becoming top-heavy. The cold Arctic water was met by the Gulf Stream, warm water from the Gulf of Mexico, which became the North Atlantic Drift, arriving at the south-west of England the drift moves between Scotland and Iceland. North of Norway the drift splits.

A northern stream goes north of Bear Island to Svalbard and the southern stream following the coast of Murmansk into the Barents Sea. The mingling of cold Arctic water and warmer water of higher salinity generates thick banks of fog for convoys to hide in but the waters drastically reduced the effectiveness of ASDIC as U-boats moved in waters of differing temperatures and density. The area is in perpetual darkness in winter and permanent daylight in the summer which makes air reconnaissance almost impossible or easy.

Arctic convoys

The first convoy was due at Murmansk around 12 October and the next convoy was to depart Iceland on 22 October. A motley of British, Allied and neutral shipping loaded with military stores and raw materials for the Soviet war effort would be assembled at Hvalfjordur, Iceland, convenient for ships from both sides of the Atlantic. By late 1941, the convoy system used in the Atlantic had been established on the Arctic run; a convoy commodore ensured that the ships' masters and signals officers attended a briefing before sailing to make arrangements for the management of the convoy, which sailed in a formation of long rows of short columns. The commodore was usually a retired naval officer, aboard a ship identified by a white pendant with a blue cross. The commodore was assisted by a Naval signals party of four men, who used lamps, semaphore flags and telescopes to pass signals, coded from books carried in a bag, weighted to be dumped overboard. In large convoys, the commodore was assisted by vice- and rear-commodores who directed the speed, course and zig-zagging of the merchant ships and liaised with the escort commander.

Following Convoy PQ 16 and the disaster to Convoy PQ 17 in July 1942, Arctic convoys were postponed for nine weeks and much of the Home Fleet was detached to the Mediterranean for Operation Pedestal, a Malta convoy. During the lull, Admiral John Tovey concluded that the Home Fleet had been of no great protection to convoys beyond Bear Island, midway between Spitsbergen and the North Cape. Tovey would oversee the operation from Scapa Flow, where the fleet was linked to the Admiralty by landline, immune to variations in wireless reception. The next convoy should be accompanied by sufficient protection against surface attack; the longer-range destroyers of the Home Fleet could be used to augment the close escort force of anti-submarine and anti-aircraft ships, to confront a sortie by German ships with the threat of a massed destroyer torpedo attack. The practice of meeting homeward-bound QP convoys near Bear Island was dispensed with and QP 14 was to wait until PQ 18 was near its destination, despite the longer journey being more demanding of crews, fuel and equipment. The new escort carrier  (Commander A. P. Colthurst) had arrived from the United States and was added to the escort force, to give the convoy air cover.

Signals intelligence

Bletchley Park

The British Government Code and Cypher School (GC&CS) based at Bletchley Park housed a small industry of code-breakers and traffic analysts. By June 1941, the German Enigma machine Home Waters (Heimish) settings used by surface ships and U-boats could quickly be read. On 1 February 1942, the Enigma machines used in U-boats in the Atlantic and Mediterranean were changed but German ships and the U-boats in Arctic waters continued with the older Heimish (Hyrda from 1942, Dolphin to the British). By mid-1941, British Y-stations were able to receive and read Luftwaffe W/T transmissions and give advance warning of Luftwaffe operations. In 1941, naval Headache personnel with receivers to eavesdrop on Luftwaffe wireless transmissions were embarked on warships and from May 1942, ships gained RAF Y computor parties, which sailed with cruiser admirals in command of convoy escorts, to interpret Luftwaffe W/T signals intercepted by the Headaches. The Admiralty sent details of Luftwaffe wireless frequencies, call signs and the daily local codes to the computors, which combined with their knowledge of Luftwaffe procedures, could glean fairly accurate details of German reconnaissance sorties. Sometimes computors predicted attacks twenty minutes before they were detected by radar.

B-Dienst

The rival German Beobachtungsdienst (B-Dienst, Observation Service) of the Kriegsmarine Marinenachrichtendienst (MND, Naval Intelligence Service) had broken several Admiralty codes and cyphers by 1939, which were used to help Kriegsmarine ships elude British forces and provide opportunities for surprise attacks. From June to August 1940, six British submarines were sunk in the Skaggerak using information gleaned from British wireless signals. In 1941, B-Dienst read signals from the Commander in Chief Western Approaches informing convoys of areas patrolled by U-boats, enabling the submarines to move into "safe" zones. B-Dienst had broken Naval Cypher No 3 in February 1942 and by March was reading up to 80 per cent of the traffic, which continued until 15 December 1943. By coincidence, the British lost access to the Shark cypher and had no information to send in Cypher No 3 which might compromise Ultra. In early September, Finnish Radio Intelligence deciphered a Soviet Air Force transmission which divulged the convoy itinerary, which was forwarded it to the Germans.

Prelude

In March 1942, Adolf Hitler issued a directive for a greater anti-convoy effort to weaken the Red Army and prevent Allied troops being transferred to northern Russia, preparatory to a landing on the coast of northern Norway. At the end of March, the air fleet was divided.

 [ Alexander Holle], the largest command, was based at Kirkenes with 2./JG 5, 10.(Z)/JG 5, 1./StG 5 (Dive Bomber Wing 5) and 1. 124 [1./(F) 124] (1 Squadron, Long Range Reconnaissance Wing 124) charged with attacks on Murmansk and Archangelsk as well as attacks on convoys. ( Hans Roth) was based at Bardufoss but had no permanently attached units, which were added according to events.

Luftwaffe tactics
As soon as information was received about the assembly of a convoy,  would send long-range reconnaissance aircraft to search Iceland and northern Scotland. Once a convoy was spotted aircraft were to keep contact as far as possible in the extreme weather of the area. If contact was lost its course at the last sighting would be extrapolated and overlapping sorties would be flown to regain contact. All three  were to co-operate as the convoy moved through their operational areas.  would begin the anti-convoy operation east to a line from the North Cape to Spitzbergen Island, whence  would take over using his and 's aircraft, which would to Kirkenes or Petsamo to stay in range.  was not allowed to divert aircraft to ground support during the operation. As soon as the convoy came into range, the aircraft were to keep up a continuous attack until the convoy docked at Murmansk or Archangelsk. From late March to late May the air effort against PQ 13, 14, 15 and QP 9, 10 and 11 had little effect, twelve sinkings out of 16 lost in QP convoys and two out of five sinkings from QP convoys being credited to the Luftwaffe; 166 merchant ships had sailed for Russia and 145 had survived the journey.

Bad weather had been nearly as dangerous as the Luftwaffe, forcing 16 of the ships in PQ 14 to turn back. In April, the spring thaw grounded many Luftwaffe aircraft and in May bad weather led to contact being lost and convoys scattering, being impossible to find in the long Arctic night. When air attacks on convoys had taken place, the formations rarely amounted to more than twelve aircraft, greatly simplifying the task of convoy anti-aircraft gunners, who shot down several aircraft in April and May. From 152 aircraft in January, reinforcements to  5 increased its strength to 221 front-line aircraft by March 1942. By May  5 had 264 aircraft based around the North Cape in northern Norway, consisting of 108 Ju 88 long-range bombers, 42 Heinkel 111 torpedo-bombers, 15 Heinkel He 115 float-plane torpedo-bombers, 30 Junkers Ju 87 dive-bombers and 74 long range Focke Wulf 200s, Junkers 88s and Blohm & Voss BV 138s.

German air-sea rescue

Co-operation was as important in rescues as it was in anti-shipping operations if people were to be saved before they succumbed to the climate and severe weather. The sea rescue aircraft comprised Heinkel He 59 floatplanes, Dornier Do 18 and Dornier Do 24 seaplanes.

 (OKL, the high command of the Luftwaffe) was not able to increase the number of search and rescue aircraft in Norway, due to a general shortage of aircraft and crews, despite Stumpff pointing out that coming down in such cold waters required extremely swift recovery and that his crews "must be given a chance of rescue" or morale could not be maintained. After the experience of PQ 16, Stumpff gave the task to the coastal reconnaissance squadrons, whose aircraft were not usually engaged in attacks on convoys. They would henceforth stand by to rescue aircrew during anti-shipping operations.

Cruiser and distant escorts
After a naval action on 2 May, the Admiralty judged that the threat from German destroyers had declined and that cruisers need not escort PQ 16 beyond Bear Island. The heavy cruisers ,  and the light cruiser  arrived later from Hvalfjörður on the west coast of Iceland. The Admiralty anticipated that the main threat to PQ 16/QP 12 were the cruiser Admiral Scheer, which was at Narvik by 10 May and the heavy cruiser Lützow which arrived on 26 May, the oiler Dithmarschen, the destroyer Hans Lody and the torpedo boat T7. Five British and three Soviet submarines were to patrol off Norway and the Russians promised to attack Luftwaffe airfields in northern Norway with 200 bombers of the Soviet Air Forces (VVS). (The Russians could only provide 20 bombers for an attack after the main German operation against the convoy had ended.)

Ships
The convoy initially consisted of 20 merchant ships, most of which had arrived with PQ 17. The convoy commodore was Captain. John Dowding, in Ocean Voice. The close escort comprised two destroyers, four corvettes, three anti-submarine minesweepers and four anti-submarine trawlers, supplemented by three anti-aircraft cruisers. Most of these ships were survivors of Convoy PQ 17. The senior officer of the escorts was Captain J. Crombie, in the minesweeper . The convoy was met at sea by the ocean escort from PQ 18, comprising the cruiser , the escort carrier  and 16 destroyers. These were supported by a covering force of three cruisers and eight destroyers and a distant covering force of two battleships, a cruiser and four destroyers. This was a substantial force, though weakened by its five day battle protecting Convoy PQ 18.

Voyage
QP 14 departed Archangel on 13 September, the day after the attack on PQ 18 started. It was accompanied by a local escort of four ASW minesweepers, which departed after two days. On 16 September QP 14 passed PQ 18 and the ocean escort began to transfer, leaving in groups to avoid drawing attention. The captain, Commander Arthur Wynne-Edwards, 86 crew and two merchant navy officers on passage were rescued; six men died after the sinking of wounds or hypothermia. A search for the U-boat found nothing. That afternoon the two submarines detached from the convoy to strike at the shadowing U-boats, which were travelling on the surface to maintain speed. In poor weather  detected  and fired four torpedoes at her but the U-boat was warned by a premature explosion and escaped. She was taken in tow but foundered four days later, before she could be brought to port.
 
On 22 September U-435 penetrated the escort screen and torpedoed three ships, one of them, Ocean Voice, carrying the convoy commodore, leaving him adrift for the second time (his ship in PQ 17 had been sunk also). The oiler  was also hit and could not be saved; she was scuttled later that day. On 23 September the pursuing  was attacked and sunk by a Liberator of Coastal Command, escorting the convoy. QP 14 arrived at Loch Ewe on 26 September.

Convoy

Merchant ships

Escorts

Axis forces

U-boats

Notes

References

Bibliography

 
 
 
 
 
 
 
 
 
 
 
 

Websites

Further reading

External links
 QP.14 at convoyweb

QP 14
C